In Pakistan, circular debt is a public debt which is a cascade of unpaid government subsidies, which results in accumulation of debt on distribution companies. When this happens, the distribution companies can't pay independent power producers who in turn, are unable to pay fuel providing companies thus creating the debt effect as prevalent in the country.

References

Debt
National debt of Pakistan
Economy of Pakistan
Electric power in Pakistan